The Lemonade Stand is the third studio album by Canadian country music singer Tenille Townes. It was released on June 26, 2020 under Columbia Nashville. The album produced two number-one singles on the Canada Country chart: "Somebody's Daughter" and "Jersey on the Wall (I'm Just Asking)".

Critical reception

The Lemonade Stand was met with "generally favorable" reviews from critics. At Metacritic, which assigns a weighted average rating out of 100 to reviews from mainstream publications, this release received an average score of 77, based on 4 reviews.

In a review for AllMusic, Stephen Thomas Erlewine writes that the album "has vague echoes of Lambert within its songs" and that "the occasional moments where [producer Jay] Joyce strips away all the pop pizzazz reveal Townes as a sharp singer/songwriter." Lee Zimmerman of American Songwriter rated the album three stars out of five and wrote that The Lemonade Stand "finds [Townes] a confident and credible artist clearly capable of courting widespread crossover appeal." Scott Roos of Exclaim! wrote that "whatever this record "is" in terms of its overall sound, it will appeal to a broad audience with its series of radio-friendly medium-tempo stompers and tender ballads," and summarized the album as a "solid" debut. Ellen Johnson of Paste applauded Townes' relatable lyric writing and wrote that she "has the power to convey powerful personal narratives in song and somehow still make you believe the words were about your own life all along."

Accolades
The album won the Juno Award for Country Album of the Year at the Juno Awards of 2021, and the Canadian Country Music Award for Album of the Year at the 2021 Canadian Country Music Awards.

Commercial performance
The Lemonade Stand debuted at number 26 on the Canadian Albums Chart dated July 10, 2020 and was the week's highest debut on the chart. In the United States, the album failed to enter the Billboard 200, but did peak at number 32 on the Top Album Sales component chart. The Lemonade Stand additionally reached number 41 on the Top Country Albums chart and number 5 on the Heatseekers Albums chart. In the UK, the album peaked at number 67 on the Scottish Albums Chart and at number 61 on the UK Album Downloads Chart, the digital sales component of the UK Albums Chart.

Track listing
Track listing adapted from Tidal.

Personnel
Credits adapted from Tidal.

 Tenille Townes – lead vocals , acoustic guitar 
 Daniel Tashian – background vocals , piano , keyboard 
 Keelan Donovan – background vocals 
 Marc Beeson – background vocals 
 Barry Dean – background vocals 
 Luke Laird – background vocals 
 Jeremy Spillman – background vocals 
 Dan Agee – background vocals 
 Sascha Skarbek – background vocals 
 Chris Gelbuda – background vocals 
 Dustin Christensen – background vocals 
 Jerry Roe – drums 
 Fred Eltringham – drums 
 Jaxon Hargrove – electric guitar , percussion , Twelve-string guitar 
 Jay Joyce – electric guitar , keyboard 
 Jimmy Manfield – percussion 
 Jason Hall – percussion 
 Gordie Sampson – background vocals 
 Josh Kear – background vocals 
 Tina Parol – background vocals 
 William Mercer – bass guitar 
 Sam Rodberg – bass guitar 
 Robert E. McNelley II – electric guitar 
 Billy Justineau – piano

Charts

References

2020 albums
Albums produced by Jay Joyce
Juno Award for Country Album of the Year albums
Country albums by Canadian artists
Canadian Country Music Association Album of the Year albums